Phytoecia remaudierei is a species of beetle in the family Cerambycidae. It was described by Villiers in 1967. It is known from Iran.

References

Phytoecia
Beetles described in 1967